Dalia Ibelhauptaitė (born 4 May 1967) is a Lithuanian opera and theatre director and producer, a television producer and former playwright.

Biography
Dalia Ibelhauptaitė was born in Vilnius in 1967, and became a director at the age of 15 when she formed the Young Theatre Company in Lithuania. At the Young Theatre Company, Dalia worked as a director and playwright until 1985 when she became assistant director at the Vilnius State Theatre. She trained at the Russian Drama Academy (GITIS) in Moscow with renowned Russian theatre director Mark Zakharov.

In 1990, she directed To Damascus at the Moscow Lencom Theatre.  In 1991, Ibelhauptaitė was invited to the Royal National Theatre Studio in London, and directed A Lawsuit as well as doing a series of workshops on Russian classical plays.  She has been in London ever since. Ibelhauptaitė has also given masterclasses at National Opera Studio and Royal National Theatre Studio in London, and is a popular teacher in China, Israel, the Netherlands, France, Los Angeles and India.

In 2005 Ibelhauptaitė directed Svejk at The Duke's on 42nd Street, which was her first show in New York. It was nominated for a Drama League award as distinguished production of the year.

In 2006 Dalia with maestro Gintaras Rinkevicius and Lithuanian State Symphony Orchestra have founded independent opera company "Bohemians" (name taken from Puccini's "La Bohème"). In 2012 this company became the basis of Vilnius City Opera. Ibelhauptaite works as artistic director and producer of Vilnius City Opera. 

In 2011 Ibelhauptaitė has been honoured by President of the Republic of Lithuania who awarded her with the Knight's Cross of the medal "Merits to Lithuania" to celebrate her contribution to culture in Lithuania. In 2021 Dalia was awarded Government Culture and Arts Award.

Ibelhauptaitė married Dexter Fletcher in Westminster, London, in 1997, after the pair met on the set of one of her stage productions in London.

In June 2019 Dexter Fletcher and Dalia Ibelhauptaitė created their film company "DXD Films Ltd.".

Credits

Theatre productions
Walpurgis Night by Erofeyev and Svejk (Gate Theatre), London
Gamblers by Gogol (Tricycle Theatre), London
Mirandolina by Goldoni (Lyric Theatre, London
The Impresario From Smyrna by Goldoni   (Old Red Lion Theatre), London
Promise (Old Red Lion Theatre), London
The Crucible by Miller (Lamda)
The Lower Depths by Gorky (Lamda)
Much Ado About Nothing by Shakespeare (CSSD)
Romeo and Juliet by Shakespeare for the Shi-Wa Charity Gala at the Globe Theatre, London. 
Svejk (The Duke's, New York

Opera productions
Don Giovanni, Mozart (Musica Nel Chiostro, Batignano Festival, Italy)
Rigoletto Verdi ('The Opera Company': Hackney Empire, London and UK tour)
Madama Butterfly Puccini  (Opera North, UK)
Eugene Onegin Tchaikovsky (Opera North, UK)
Don Pasquale Donizetti (Opera Zuid, Netherlands)
"Gambler" Prokofiev (Opera Zuid, Netherlands)
Un Ballo In Maschera Verdi (Lithuanian National Opera)
I Pagliacci Leoncavallo (Congress Palace, Lithuania)
Showcase (The Queen Elizabeth Hall, London)
La Forza del Destino G.Verdi (Lithuanian National Opera and Israel National Opera) 
La Bohème Puccini (Congress Palace, Lithuania )
Die Zauberflöte Mozart (Congress Palace, Lithuania ) 
"Werther" Massenet (Congress Palace, Lithuania )
"Sweeney Todd: the Demon Barber of Fleet Street" Sondheim (Congress Palace, Lithuania )
"XYZ - electronic opera fantasy" (Industrial spaces, Lithuania )
"Onegin" Tchaikovsky (Congress Palace, Lithuania )
"Katia Kabanova" Janáček (Congress Palace, Lithuania )
"Manon Lescaut" Puccini (Congress Palace, Lithuania ) 
"Cosi fan Tutti" Mozart (Congress Palace, Lithuania ) 
"Il Trovatore" Verdi (Congress Palace, Lithuania ) 
"Pelleas et Melisande" Debussy (Congress Palace, Lithuania ) 
"Tosca" Puccini (Congress Palace, Lithuania ) 
"E-Carmen" Bizet/electronic version by M.Adomaitis (Compensa concert hall, Lithuania ) 
"Faust" Gounod (Congress Palace, Lithuania ) 
"Samson et Dalila" Saint-Saens (Congress Palace, Lithuania ) 
"Queen of Spades" Tchaikovsky (Congress Palace, Lithuania )

Staged Concerts
"Bohemian Dreams" (Congress Palace, Lithuania )
"The Return of the Nightingales" (Congress Palace, Lithuania ) 
"Arias from the Shower" (Congress Palace, Lithuania )

Work as producer
"VCO ROCK" (dir.G.Seduikis) (Sports Palace, Lithuania ) 
"Hansel and Gretel" Humperdinck (dir.G.Seduikis) (Congress Palace, Lithuania ) 
"Stories from New York" (dir.G.Seduikis) (Congress Palace, Lithuania )

Short films
Let The Good Times Roll by Dexter Fletcher, starring Bob Hoskins, Ron Cook and Dexter Fletcher
Feeling Good by Dexter Fletcher, starring Jason Flemyng.

Television producer
The Offer, Paramount%2B, 10 episodes

References

External links

1967 births
Living people
Lithuanian dramatists and playwrights
Lithuanian opera directors
Lithuanian theatre directors